Chebarkul (Sıbarkül) is a rural locality (a village) in Lagerevsky Selsoviet, Salavatsky District, Bashkortostan, Russia. The population was 214 as of 2010. There are 2 streets.

Geography 
Chebarkul is located 37 km east of Maloyaz (the district's administrative centre) by road. Sharyakovo is the nearest rural locality.

References 

Rural localities in Salavatsky District